Marguerite Antonia Radclyffe Hall (12 August 1880 – 7 October 1943) was an English poet and author, best known for the novel The Well of Loneliness, a groundbreaking work in lesbian literature. In adulthood, Hall often went by the name John, rather than Marguerite.

Early life 

Marguerite Antonia Radclyffe Hall was born in 1880 at "Sunny Lawn", Durley Road, Bournemouth, Hampshire (now Dorset), to Radclyffe ("Rat") Radclyffe-Hall (1846-1898) and Mary Jane Sager (née Diehl). Hall's father was a wealthy philanderer, educated at Eton and Oxford but seldom working, since he inherited a large amount of money from his father, an eminent physician who was head of the British Medical Association; her mother was an unstable American widow from Philadelphia. Radclyffe's father left in 1882, abandoning young Radclyffe and her mother. However, he did leave behind a considerable inheritance for Radclyffe.

Radclyffe's mother subsequently married Albert Visetti, a professor of singing, whom Radclyffe did not like and who had a tempestuous relationship with her mother. Radclyffe also despised her mother. Throughout her childhood, Mary made it clear that Radclyffe was unwanted after failing to get an abortion during pregnancy. She frequently dipped into Radclyffe's inheritance money for herself.

As Hall grew older and gained more autonomy, she realized that she had enough inheritance money from her father to live without working or marrying. She began to do as she pleased, dressing in typical men's fashion of the times, such as trousers, monocles and hats. Hall was a lesbian but described herself as a "congenital invert", a term taken from the writings of Havelock Ellis and other turn-of-the-century sexologists. Having reached adulthood without a vocation, she spent much of her twenties pursuing women she eventually lost to marriage.

Batten (nicknamed "Ladye") was 51 years old to Hall's 27, and was married with an adult daughter and grandchildren. They fell in love and, after Batten's husband died, they set up residence together. Batten introduced Hall to a circle of artistic and intellectual women, many of them lesbians. She also was the first to call Hall "John", after noting her resemblance to one of Hall's male ancestors, and Hall used this name for the rest of her life. Batten encouraged Hall to begin seeking publishing for her poetry.

In 1915, Hall fell in love with Batten's cousin, Una Troubridge (1887–1963). Troubridge was a sculptor and the wife of Vice-Admiral Ernest Troubridge, and the mother of a young daughter. Troubridge and Hall would be lovers for the remainder of their lives. The romance caused tension between Batten, Hall, and Troubridge, until 1916 when Batten died. Upon her death, Hall had Batten's corpse embalmed and a silver crucifix blessed by the pope laid on it. Hall, Batten, and Troubridge were "undeterred by the Church's admonitions on same-sex relationships. Hall's Catholicism sat beside a life-long attachment to spiritualism and reincarnation." In 1917, Radclyffe Hall and Una Troubridge began living together. From 1924 to 1929 they lived at 37 Holland Street, Kensington, London. The relationship lasted until Hall's death.

Career
After a period of travel and education, Hall published five books of poetry between 1906 and 1915.

Hall's first novel was The Unlit Lamp, published in 1924. It follows Joan Ogden, a young girl who dreams of setting up a flat in London with her friend Elizabeth (a so-called Boston marriage) and studying to become a doctor, but feels trapped by her manipulative mother's emotional dependence on her. Its length and grimness made it a difficult book to sell, so Hall deliberately chose a lighter theme for her next novel, a social comedy entitled The Forge (1924). While she had used her full name for her early poetry collections, she shortened it to M. Radclyffe Hall for The Forge. The book was a modest success, making the bestseller list of John O'London's Weekly. The Unlit Lamp, which followed it into print, was the first printed with her name simply as Radclyffe Hall.

There followed another comic novel, A Saturday Life (1925), and then Adam's Breed (1926), a novel about an Italian headwaiter who, becoming disgusted with his job and even with food itself, gives away his belongings and lives as a hermit in the forest. The book's mystical themes have been compared to Hermann Hesse's Siddhartha. It sold well, was critically acclaimed, and won both the Prix Femina and the James Tait Black Prize, a feat previously achieved only by E. M. Forster's A Passage to India. In 1926, she published her first short story dealing with homosexuality. Twelve days later, she began writing The Well of Loneliness.

The Well of Loneliness

Hall's most well-known work is The Well of Loneliness, the only one of her eight novels to have overt lesbian themes. Published in 1928, The Well of Loneliness deals with the life of Stephen Gordon, a masculine lesbian who, like Hall herself, identifies as an "invert". The novel paints a vulnerable, sympathetic portrayal of lesbians.

Although The Well of Loneliness is not sexually explicit, it was nevertheless the subject of an obscenity trial in the UK, which resulted in an order for the destruction of all copies of the book. The United States allowed its publication only after a long court battle. It is currently published in the UK by Virago, and by Anchor Press in the United States. The Well of Loneliness was number seven on a list of the top 100 lesbian and gay novels compiled by The Publishing Triangle in 1999. It is now noted as the predecessor to the golden age of lesbian pulp fiction.

The Girls of Radcliff Hall

British composer and bon vivant Gerald Tyrwhitt-Wilson, 14th Baron Berners, wrote a roman à clef titled The Girls of Radcliff Hall, in which he depicts himself and his circle of friends, including Cecil Beaton and Oliver Messel, as lesbian schoolgirls at a school named Radcliff Hall. The novel was written under the pseudonym Adela Quebec and published and distributed privately; the indiscretions to which it alluded created an uproar among Berners' intimates and acquaintances, making the whole affair widely discussed in the 1930s. Cecil Beaton attempted to have all the copies destroyed. The book subsequently disappeared from circulation, making it extremely rare. The story is, however, included in Berners' Collected Tales and Fantasies.

Later novels
Hall published one novel after The Well of Loneliness. An anonymous verse lampoon titled The Sink of Solitude had appeared during the controversy over The Well. Although its primary targets were James Douglas, who had called for The Wells suppression, and the Home Secretary William Joynson-Hicks, who had started legal proceedings, it also mocked Hall and her book. One of the illustrations, which depicted Hall nailed to a cross, so horrified her that she could barely speak of it for years afterward. Her sense of guilt at being depicted in a drawing that she saw as blasphemous led to her choice of a religious subject for her next novel The Master of the House.

At Hall's insistence, The Master of the House was published with no cover blurb, which may have misled some purchasers into thinking it was another novel about "inversion". Advance sales were strong, and the book made No. 1 on The Observers bestseller list, but it received poor reviews in several key periodicals, and sales soon dropped off. In the United States reviewers treated the book more kindly, but shortly after the book's publication, all copies were seized - not by the police, but by creditors; Hall's American publisher had gone bankrupt. Houghton Mifflin took over the rights, but by the time the book could be republished, its sales momentum was lost.

Later years and death 

Hall lived with Troubridge in London and, during the 1930s, in the small town of Rye, East Sussex, noted for its many writers, including her contemporary the novelist E. F. Benson. Hall also was involved in affairs with other women throughout the years, including the actress Ethel Waters.

In 1930, Hall received the Gold Medal of the Eichelbergher Humane Award. She was a member of the PEN club, the council of the Society for Psychical Research and a fellow of the Zoological Society. Hall was listed at No. 16 in the top 500 lesbian and gay heroes in The Pink Paper.

On holiday around 1934, Troubridge contracted enteritis. Evguenia Souline, a Russian nurse, was hired to care for her. Hall and Souline ended up having an affair, which Troubridge knew about and painfully tolerated. It unsettled Troubridge deeply, but she remained with Hall.

In 1943, Hall was diagnosed with cancer of the rectum. Operations were unsuccessful and she died at the age of 63. Her body is buried in a vault in the Circle of Lebanon on the western side of Highgate Cemetery at the entrance of the chamber of the Batten family, where Mabel is also buried.

Works

Novels

 The Forge (1924)
 The Unlit Lamp (1924)
 A Saturday Life (1925)
 Adam's Breed (1926)
 Miss Ogilvy Finds Herself (1926) - short stories
 The Well of Loneliness (1928)
 The Master of the House (1932)
 The Sixth Beatitude (William Heineman Ltd, London, 1936)

Poetry

 Dedicated to Sir Arthur Sullivan (England: s.n., 1894)
 Twixt Earth and Stars (London: John and Edward Bumpus Ltd., 1906)
 A Sheaf of Verses : Poems (London: J. and E. Bumpus, 1908)
 Poems of the Past & Present (London: Chapman And Hall, 1910)
 Songs of Three Counties and Other Poems (London: Chapman & Hall, 1913)
 The Forgotten Island (London: Chapman & Hall, 1915)
 Rhymes and Rhythms (Milan, 1948)

Archives 
Many of Hall and Troubridge's surviving papers are held at the Harry Ransom Center, University of Texas, including a manuscript of The Well of Loneliness, notebooks, diaries, and correspondence. Typescript copies of Hall's love letters to Evguenia Souline, written during the late 1930s and early 1940s, are held at the Cadbury Research Library, University of Birmingham.

References

Further reading
 Una Troubridge (2008) [1961]: The Life and Death of Radclyffe Hall (London: Hammond). Hesperides Press. .
 Lovat Dickson (1975): Radclyffe Hall at the Well of Loneliness: A Sapphic Chronicle (HarperCollins). .
 Michael J.N. Baker (1985): Our Three Selves. The Life of Radclyffe Hall (New York: William Morrow). .
 Nerina Milletti, Rime e Ritmi di Radclyffe Hall
 Diana Souhami (1998): The Trials of Radclyffe Hall (London: Weidenfeld & Nicolson). 
 Sally Cline (1999): Radclyffe Hall: A Woman Called John. (Overlook Press). .

External links

 
 
 
 
 
 Radclyffe Hall Collection, Photographs at the Harry Ransom Center at the University of Texas at Austin
 Radclyffe Hall and Una Troubridge: papers and research material series, collectionscanada.gc.ca; retrieved 9 April 2014.

1880 births
1943 deaths
20th-century English novelists
20th-century English poets
20th-century English women writers
Alumni of King's College London
Burials at Highgate Cemetery
Roman Catholic writers
Deaths from cancer in England
Deaths from colorectal cancer
English Roman Catholics
English women novelists
James Tait Black Memorial Prize recipients
English lesbian writers
English LGBT novelists
English LGBT poets
English spiritualists
LGBT Roman Catholics
Parapsychologists
Writers from Bournemouth
Pseudonymous women writers
20th-century pseudonymous writers